Wilcox County Courthouse may refer to:

Wilcox County Courthouse (Alabama), Camden, Alabama
Wilcox County Courthouse (Georgia), Abbeville, Georgia